The Razdolnaya (formerly: Суйфун Suyfun) or Suifen is a river in People's Republic of China and Russia. It flows into the Amur Bay of the Sea of Japan.

The name
Suifen is the Manchu word  (suifun) for awl, referring to the shape of a species of Oncomelania snail.

In Russian, the river was originally known under the same Manchu / Chinese name (rendered as Суйфун (Suifun) in Russian). In 1972, in the aftermath of the Zhenbao Island incident (1969), toponyms of Chinese origin in Primorsky Krai were replaced en masse with newly designed Russian names; as part of this project, the Russian part of the Suifen received the name Razdolnaya, which can be translated from Russian as "widely flowing".

Geography
The source of the Suifen is the confluence of the Xiaosuifen (Lesser Suifen) River and the Dasuifen (Greater Suifen) River in Heilongjiang.

Suifenhe City was named after the Chinese name of the river. Downstream of the city, the river enters Russian territory, and flows into Amur Bay through Khanka Lowlands.

The major tributaries of the river are the Granitnaya (99 km), the Borisovka (86 km) and the Komarovka (76 km, main tributary Rakovka). The city Ussuriysk was founded in 1866 at the confluence of the Suifen and Komarovka rivers.

References

Drainage basins of the Sea of Japan
Rivers of Heilongjiang
Rivers of Primorsky Krai